Snegotin Ridge (‘Snegotinski Rid’ \'sne-go-tin-ski 'rid\) is the ice-covered ridge rising to 1230 m in its eastern part on the northwest side of Louis-Philippe Plateau on Trinity Peninsula in Graham Land, Antarctica.  It is overlooking Bransfield Strait to the north, and Prelez Gap and the head of Malorad Glacier to the west-southwest.  Snegotin Ridge is extending 6.5 km in southwest-northeast direction, 4 km wide, and linked to the south to Louis-Philippe Plateau by Huhla Col.

The ridge is named after the settlement of Snegotin in Southern Bulgaria.

Location
German-British mapping in 1996.

Maps
 Trinity Peninsula. Scale 1:250000 topographic map No. 5697. Institut für Angewandte Geodäsie and British Antarctic Survey, 1996.
 Antarctic Digital Database (ADD). Scale 1:250000 topographic map of Antarctica. Scientific Committee on Antarctic Research (SCAR). Since 1993, regularly updated.

Notes

References
 Snegotin Ridge. SCAR Composite Antarctic Gazetteer
 Bulgarian Antarctic Gazetteer. Antarctic Place-names Commission. (details in Bulgarian, basic data in English)

External links
 Snegotin Ridge. Copernix satellite image

Ridges of Graham Land
Landforms of Trinity Peninsula
Bulgaria and the Antarctic